The 2009 British Academy Scotland Awards were held on 8 November 2009 at the Glasgow Science Centre, honouring the best Scottish film and television productions of 2009. Presented by BAFTA Scotland, accolades are handed out for the best in feature-length film that were screened at British cinemas during 2008. The Nominees were announced on 17 October 2009. The list caused some controversy for the lack of film actresses making the nominations. The ceremony was hosted by Lorraine Kelly.

Bill Forsyth, Jeremy Isaacs, David Jones and Patrick Doyle were honoured with Outstanding Contribution awards at this ceremony.

Winners and nominees

Winners are listed first and highlighted in boldface.

Outstanding Contribution to Film
Bill Forsyth

Outstanding Contribution to Craft (In Memory of Robert McCann)
Patrick Doyle

Outstanding Contribution to Broadcasting
Jeremy Isaacs

Outstanding International Achievement (Digital Media)
David Jones

See also
BAFTA Scotland
62nd British Academy Film Awards
81st Academy Awards
15th Screen Actors Guild Awards
29th Golden Raspberry Awards

References

External links
BAFTA Scotland Home page

2009
BAF
2009 in Scotland
2000s in Glasgow
BAF
BAF
BAF
Brit
November 2009 events in the United Kingdom